A constitutional referendum was held in Zimbabwe on 16 and 17 March 2013, after being postponed from September 2011 and from 30 June 2011. Ultimately the new constitution was approved by 94.5% of voters.

Background
President Robert Mugabe told the United Nations that the new government formed in February 2009 "has fostered an environment of peace and stability. Several reforms have been implemented and Government has created and instituted constitutional bodies agreed to in the Global Political Agreement." As a result, a constitutional outreach programme was underway; upon whose completion a draft constitution would be formulated as a precursor to a referendum. He hoped this would be followed by an election.

New constitution
The new constitution would limit the President to two five-year terms in office, though it did not apply retrospectively and therefore Mugabe was not restricted from seeking re-election. It abolished the post of Prime Minister, and established an independent prosecuting authority, a peace and reconciliation commission and an anti-corruption commission. It also allowed for dual citizenship, but prevented any legal challenges to the land reform programme.

Results

References

2013 referendums
2013 constitutional referendum
Constitutional referendum
2013 elections in Africa
Constitutional referendums in Zimbabwe